Raija Siekkinen (pronounced Ri-a) (11 February 1953 – 7 February 2004) was a Finnish writer and recipient of the Eino Leino Prize in 1998.

References

Finnish writers
Recipients of the Eino Leino Prize
1953 births
2004 deaths